The Inner Mounting Flame Tour was the first concert tour by the jazz fusion band Mahavishnu Orchestra.

History 
The band's first ever live performance was on July 21, 1971 at the Gaslight at the Au Go Go in New York City, where they opened for blues guitarist John Lee Hooker. McLaughlin recalled: "The first set was shaky but the second set just took off and every night it was great. They wanted to hold us over and a few days after the second week ... we went into the studio". The band ending up doing a 18-date residency at the night club. The band ended up performing in several colleges, high schools, night clubs, music venues with a capacity of less than a thousand people, and small arenas and sports venues across the United States. The band also played at the Mar y Sol Pop Festival in Puerto Rico, the Summerfest festival in Milwaukee, and many more festivals across North America. The group also played in Europe for the first time, simply appearing at music festivals. The band grew to popularity thanks to appearing at festivals and touring endlessly, and the group's shows were praised by The Harvard Crimson and The New York Times.

Live releases 
Live material from this tour has appeared on the following releases:

 "The Noonward Race" from April 3, 1972 at the Mar y Sol Pop Festival in Puerto Rico was released on the 1972 live album Mar Y Sol: The First International Puerto Rico Pop Festival, the 2011 re-release of the 1980 compilation album The Best of the Mahavishnu Orchestra and the 2011 remaster of The Inner Mounting Flame.

Tour band 
 John McLaughlin - guitar
 Jerry Goodman - violin
 Rick Laird - bass guitar
 Jan Hammer - keyboards, organ
 Billy Cobham - drums, percussion

Typical set lists 
All songs written by John McLaughlin.

Tour dates

Notes

References 
Citations

Bibliography
 

1971 concert tours
1971 in American music
1972 concert tours
1972 in American music
Concert tours of the United States
Concert tours of North America
Concert tours of Europe